The Kunming Economic and Technology Development Zone (KETDZ), is a state-level economic development zone established on February 13, 2000 in East Kunming, Yunnan Province, China. It is administratively under Kunming Prefecture. It has a developed area of 6 square kilometers.

Industrial structure
The KETDZ has formed the industrial chain with the following major industries as its pillar industries: 
tobacco and related industries
IT and electronics manufacturing
bio-pharmaceuticals, food processing
new materials development industry

Investment priorities
Established industries
integrated optical-electric-mechanical industry
biofood industry
bio-pharmaceutical industry

Commercialization and marketing
information electronics
high-efficiency agriculture
new materials
new building materials
environment-friendly technologies

Investment and modernization
Logistics
Trading services

Economic spin-offs
Venture capital
Intermediary services
Cultural programs
Educational programs

Communication and transportation

Road
The KETDZ is 4 kilometers from the downtown Kunming, where the highways lead straight to the China-Laos border town of Mohan, the China-Vietnam border town of Hekou, and the China-Myanmar (Burma) border town of Ruili. All three border towns are rated as Grade A border ports of China. All the highways within a radius of 200 kilometers from Kunming are of high-grade standards.

Railway
A railroad network has been built around Kunming, consisting of the Guiyang-Kunming, Chengdu-Kunming, Nanning-Kunming, Guangtong-Dali, and Yunnan-Vietnam Railways. The KETDZ is 2 kilometers away from the Kunming East Railway Station, and 4 kilometers from the Kunming South Railway Station, both are rail centers for both cargo and passenger transportation.

Air transportation
The Kunming International Airport, 1.8 kilometers from the KETDZ, is Yunnan's most important gateway to international destinations. It operates eight air routes to overseas airports such as Singapore, Rangoon, Kuala Lumpur, Seoul, Osaka, and more than 70 domestic routes to Hong Kong, Macao, and other cities.

Harbor
The KETDZ has access to ocean shipping at the Beihai and Fangcheng Ports in Guangxi province via the Nanning-Kunming Railway, at Zhanjiang Port of Guangdong province via the Guiyang-Kunming Railway, at Shanghai Port, and at Haiphong of Vietnam via the Yunnan-Vietnam Railway.

See also
Kunming High-tech Industrial Development Zone
Hekou Border Economic Cooperation Zone
Ruili Border Economic Cooperation Zone
Wanding Border Economic Cooperation Zone
Economic and Technological Development Zones

References
http://www.chinadaily.com.cn/bizchina/2006-04/19/content_571682.htm

External links
Kunming Economic and Technology Development Zone (KETDZ) Official Website

Kunming
Economy of Yunnan
Special Economic Zones of China